The 2012 Guam Democratic presidential caucuses took place on May 5 in the U.S. territory of Guam as one of the Democratic Party's primaries ahead of the 2012 presidential election.

No other primary election was scheduled for this day. The Republican Party's Guam caucus took place on March 10, 2012.

Results 
The Democratic Party caucus took place on May 5. Barack Obama ran unopposed in most primaries across the nation, including Guam. He received 100% of the caucus vote against no opponents.

See also 
 2012 United States presidential straw poll in Guam
 2012 United States presidential election
 2012 Guam Republican presidential caucuses

References 

Guam
Democratic caucus
2012